Sangrama was the general of King Udayadityavarman II of the Khmer Empire in what is now Cambodia. According to stele at Baphuon, he put down a revolt by Aravindahrada in 1051, who then fled to Champa. Two additional revolts in 1065, by Kamvau and then by the brothers Slvat and Siddhikara with Sasantibhuvana, were put down by Sangrama, but not before he was wounded in the jaw.

References

Cambodian Hindus
Cambodian military personnel
Year of birth missing
Year of death missing
Khmer Empire
11th-century Cambodian people